Rose Kingdom (foaled 10 May 2007) is a Japanese Thoroughbred racehorse and sire. In a racing career which lasted from 2009 until 2013 he won six of his twenty-five races. As a two-year-old in 2009 he was undefeated in three races and was voted Japanese Champion two-year-old colt. In the following year he won the Kobe Shimbun Hai and finished second in both the Satsuki Sho and the Tokyo Yushun before being awarded the Japan Cup on the disqualification of Buena Vista. He won only once in sixteen subsequent starts and was retired from racing in 2013.

Background
Rose Kingdom is a dark bay or brown horse with a small white star standing 1.63 metres bred in Japan by Northern Farm. His sire, King Kamehameha was one of the best Japanese colts of his generation, beating a field including Heart's Cry and Daiwa Major in the 2004 Japanese Derby. His other winners as a breeding stallion include Lord Kanaloa, Lovely Day, Belshazzar (Japan Cup Dirt), Rulership (Queen Elizabeth II Cup) and Apapane. Rose Kingdom's dam Rosebud won three races including the Grade II Fillies' Revue and finished second in the Oka Sho, Yushun Himba and Queen Elizabeth II Commemorative Cup. She was a descendant of the Poule d'Essai des Pouliches winner Riverqueen.

During his racing career Rose Kingdom was owned by the Sunday Racing Co Ltd and was trained by Kojiro Hashiguchi.

Racing career

2009: two-year-old season
On his racecourse debut, Rose Kingdom contested a maiden race over 1800 metres at Kyoto Racecourse on 25 October and won from Victoire Pisa and nine others. In the following month he was stepped up in class for the Grade III Tokyo Sports Hai Nisai Stakes and won from Tosen Phantom. On 20 December, Rose Kingdom was moved up to Grade I class for Japan's most prestigious race for two-year-olds, the Asahi Hai Futurity Stakes over 1600 metres at Nakayama Racecourse. Ridden by the 42-year-old Futoshi Komaki, he won by one and a quarter lengths from Eishin Apollon (later to win the Mile Championship) with Daiwa Barbarian two lengths back in third. After the race Komaki explained "He was very relaxed from the moment he set foot on the course today... He's such an easy ride and I just hope I can keep winning the big races with him. At my age, I'm a veteran in most people's eyes, but I haven't won that many big races yet".

In the JRA Awards for 2009, Rose Kingdom was awarded the title of Japanese Champion two-year-old colt taking 285 of the 287 votes.

2010: three-year-old season
On his first appearance as a three-year-old Rose Kingdom sustained his first defeat when he finished third behind Aliseo and Gestalt in the Grade II Fuji TV Sho Spring Stakes over 1800 metres at Nakayama on 21 March. In April he contested the Grade I Satsuki Sho over 2000 metres and finished fourth behind Victoire Pisa, Hiruno d'Amour and Eishin Flash. On 30 May he was one of seventeen colts to contest the Tokyo Yushun and finished second by a neck to Eishin Flash with Victoire Pisa in third.

After a break of almost four months, Rose Kingdom returned in the Grade II Kobe Shimbun Hai over 2400 metres at Hanshin Racecourse on 26 September. Ridden by Yutaka Take he recorded his first win of the year as he defeated Eishin Flash by a neck with Big Week three length back in third place. In the Grade I Kikuka Sho at Kyoto on 24 October, Rose Kingdom was moved up in distance to 3000 metres and finished second to Big Week, with Beat Black in third.

The 30th running of the Japan Cup in front of 106,322 at Tokyo on 28 November attracted eighteen runners and Rose Kingdom, ridden by Take, started the 7.8/1 second favourite behind Buena Vista (a filly also owned by Sunday Racing) and the three-year-old filly Pelusa. The overseas challenge comprised Fifty Proof from Canada, Voila Ici (Premio Roma, Gran Premio di Milano) from Italy, Cirrus des Aigles, Marinous (Grand Prix de Deauville) and Timos from France, Joshua Tree from Ireland and Dandino (King George V Stakes) from Britain. The other Japanese-trained runners included Nakayama Festa, Eishin Flash, Oken Bruce Lee (2008 Kikuka Sho) and Jaguar Mail (Tenno Sho spring). Take settled the colt in fifth place and switched from the rail position to make a challenge on the outside in the straight. He was bumped when Buena Vista cut to the inside but recovered to take second place, one and three quarter lengths behind the filly and a nose ahead of Victoire Pisa. After a 24-minute stewards inquiry Buena Vista was disqualified for causing interference and the race was awarded to Rose Kingdom. His trainer admitted to having "mixed feelings" about the result but praised the colt saying "being bumped a few times didn't faze him, and he put in another effort even after that to finish second. He's always had guts but the determination he showed today was amazing."

Plans to for the colt to end his season in the Arima Kinen were abandoned when he developed colic two days before the race.

In the JRA Awards for 2010, Rose Kingdom finished second to Victoire Pisa in the voting for Japanese Champion three-year-old colt.

2011: four-year-old season
Rose Kingdom began his four-year-old season by finishing third to Rulership in a Grade II race at Kyoto in January and then finished third again in the Grade II Nikkei Sho at Hanshin in April. When moved back up to Grade I class he finished down the field behind Hiruno d'Amour in the spring running of the Tenno Sho and then ran fourth to Earnestly in the Takarazuka Kinen. He started his autumn campaign in the Grade II Kyoto Daishoten on 9 October. Ridden by Hiroki Goto, he was made the odds-on favourite and won from Beat Black, Oken Bruce Lee and Jaguar Mail. Goto commented: "I think he has grown up and he feels better than he did when I rode him to finish second in last year's Derby."

Rose Kingdom made little subsequent impact that year, finishing unplaced in the autumn Tenno Sho, the Japan Cup and the Arima Kinen.

2012 & 2013: later career
Rose Kingdom remained in training for two further seasons, competing in many of Japan's top races, but had no further successes. In 2012 he managed one fourth place from six starts, but in the following year he finished well down the field in both of his races as a six-year-old.

Stud record
Rose Kingdom was retired from racing to become a breeding stallion. For the 2015 season he was based at the Breeders Stallion Station. In 2018, Rose Kingdom suffered a head injury that left him unable to stand stud, resulting in him being retired and pensioned at the Versailles Farm.

On September 15, 2019, the manes of Rose Kingdom and Taiki Shuttle, a fellow JRA Champion pensioned at Versailles Farm at the time, were mysteriously cut by an unknown person. It appeared that a sharp tool had been used to cut the hair, but the horses were otherwise unharmed. The farm filed a report with the Hokkaido Police and ceased visitation to the farm for security and investigative purposes. The suspect, 55 year old Kazuyo Tanaka from Kawaguchi, Saitama, was arrested the following year.

Pedigree

References 

2007 racehorse births
Racehorses bred in Japan
Racehorses trained in Japan
Thoroughbred family 1-w
Japan Cup winners